"Don't Let It Go to Your Head" is a song by American singer Jean Carn. It has spawned multiple cover versions.

Brand New Heavies version
British band Brand New Heavies had a UK #24 hit with their cover of the song in 1992.

Charts

Brand Nubian version
Brand Nubian released it as the second single from their album Foundation. This version charted at #3 on the Hot Rap Singles chart, #24 on the Hot R&B/Hip-Hop Singles & Tracks chart, and crossed over to the Billboard Hot 100, peaking at #54.

Other covers
The 1979 Black Harmony version was featured as part of the Grand Theft Auto: San Andreas soundtrack.

References

1978 songs
1978 singles
1992 singles
1998 singles
Songs written by Leon Huff
Songs written by Kenny Gamble
Philadelphia International Records singles
Jean Carn songs
The Brand New Heavies songs
Music Week number-one dance singles